William Frederick Lowndes Frith  (8 July 1871 – 6 October 1956) was an English cricketer.  Frith's batting and bowling styles are unknown.  He was born at Wandsworth, London. He changed his name to William Frederick Lowndes Frith-Lowndes (to "use the surname of Lowndes in addition to and after that of Frith") in July 1906.

Frith made his first-class debut for London County against Cambridge University in 1901.  He played a further first-class match for the London County in 1902 against Leicestershire.   He scored 4 runs and took a single wicket for the cost of 23 runs.  His debut for Buckinghamshire came in the 1908 Minor Counties Championship against the Surrey Second XI.  He played Minor counties cricket for Buckinghamshire from 1908 to 1913, which included 30 Minor Counties Championship matches.

He was appointed MBE in the post-war civilian honours in 1920, as "National Service Representative, Chesham". He died at West Wittering, Sussex, on 6 October 1956.  He was survived by his son Geoffrey Lowndes, who played first-class cricket for Oxford University, Hampshire and the Marylebone Cricket Club.

Firth helped plant one of the 'Victory Oaks' in Lowndes Park in Chesham in 1919. First and his wife Ethel Maude, lived at The Bury in Chesham and donated the extensive grounds of the house to the people of Chesham in 1953.

References

External links
William Frith at ESPNcricinfo
William Frith at CricketArchive

1871 births
1956 deaths
People from Wandsworth
English cricketers
London County cricketers
Buckinghamshire cricketers
Buckinghamshire cricket captains